Sankt Martin bei Lofer is a municipality in the district of Zell am See (Pinzgau region), in the state of Salzburg in Austria.

Geography
The municipality lies in the Loferer Land in the Pinzgauer Saalach valley.

References

External links 
 St. Martin bei Lofer

Cities and towns in Zell am See District